Durban-Corbières is a commune in the Aude department in southern France.

Population

Sights
 Jardin botanique Méditerrannéen

See also
 Château de Durban
 Corbières AOC
 Communes of the Aude department

References

Communes of Aude
Aude communes articles needing translation from French Wikipedia